Newfoundland is an island in North America and part of the province of Newfoundland and Labrador.

Newfoundland may also refer to:

Places

Canada
 Three islands in the current province of Newfoundland and Labrador share this name:
 Newfoundland (island), the main island
 Newfoundland Island, Labrador, off the coast of Labrador
 Ukasiksalik Island, in Davis Inlet, Labrador, also known as Newfoundland Island
 As a political entity:
 Newfoundland Colony, an English and later British colony from 1583 to 1907
 Dominion of Newfoundland, a self-governing dominion of the British Empire from 1907 to 1949
 Newfoundland, a province of Canada from 1949 to 2001; see 1948 Newfoundland referendums
 Newfoundland and Labrador, the province's name since 2001

United Kingdom
Newfoundland, London, a residential skyscraper development opened in 2021

United States
 Newfoundland, Kentucky
 Newfoundland, New Jersey
 Newfoundland station (New York, Susquehanna and Western Railroad)
 Newfoundland, Pennsylvania
 Newfoundland Mountains, of Utah, in the Great Salt Lake Desert

Transportation
 , a Royal Navy cruiser
 , a British Royal Mail Ship that became a hospital ship in the Second World War and was sunk in the Mediterranean
 , a sealing ship that lost many crew in a disaster in 1914
 , a proposed and cancelled Canada-class nuclear submarine for Canadian Forces Maritime Command

 45573 Newfoundland, a British LMS Jubilee Class locomotive

Animals
 Newfoundland dog
 Newfoundland pony
 Newfoundland sheep

Literature
 New Found Land (Christopher novel), a book by John Christopher
 New Found Land (Wolf novel), a book by Allan Wolf
 Dirty Linen and New-Found-Land, a pair of plays by Tom Stoppard that are always performed together
 Newfoundland: Journey Into a Lost Nation, a non-fiction book by Michael Crummey

See also
 New Finland, a district in Saskatchewan 
 Terre-Neuve (disambiguation)